Ishasha border point is a border crossing station and customs post in the Kanungu District in the Western Region of Uganda.

Location
The border point is a designated end of the Rukungiri–Kihihi–Ishasha–Kanungu Road, which partially forms the boundary of the Ishasha Sector of Queen Elizabeth National Park. Across the Ishasha River, which serves as the international border, lies the town of Ishasha, Democratic Republic of the Congo and the adjacent Virunga National Park inside which that town is situated.

The geographical coordinates of Ishasha, Uganda are 0°43'32.0"S, 29°37'52.0"E (Latitude:-0.725556; Longitude:29.631111).

Overview

The station is the location of a UNHCR transit centre for refugees fleeing violence in eastern DRC. From there, refugees are sent on to safer refugee settlements such as Nakivale and Kyangwali.

To the immediate north of Ishasha, Uganda is the Ishasha Sector of Queen Elizabeth National Park (QENP), in Uganda. Adjacent to QENP, across the Ishasha River, is Virunga National Park, in the DRC. The area benefits from tourist activity but personal safety remains a concern.

See also
Kanungu District
Transport in Uganda

References

External links
UNHCR operations in Uganda
Uganda entry points

Kanungu District
Populated places in Western Region, Uganda
Democratic Republic of the Congo–Uganda border crossings
Democratic Republic of the Congo–Uganda relations